Tetrapropylammonium perruthenate (TPAP or TPAPR) is the chemical compound described by the formula N(C3H7)4RuO4. Sometimes known as the Ley–Griffith reagent, this ruthenium compound is used as a reagent in organic synthesis. This salt consists of the tetrapropylammonium cation and the perruthenate anion, .

Uses 
Ruthenium tetroxide is a highly aggressive oxidant, but TPAP, which is its one-electron reduced derivative, is a mild oxidizing agent for the conversion of primary alcohols to aldehydes (the Ley oxidation). Secondary alcohols are similarly oxidized to ketones. It can also be used to oxidize primary alcohols all the way to the carboxylic acid with a higher catalyst loading, larger amount of the cooxidant, and addition of two equivalents of water. In this situation, the aldehyde reacts with water to form the geminal diol hydrate, which is then oxidized again.

The oxidation generates water that can be removed by adding molecular sieves. TPAP is expensive, but it can be used in catalytic amounts. The catalytic cycle is maintained by adding a stoichiometric amount of a co-oxidant such as N-methylmorpholine N-oxide or molecular oxygen.

TPAP is also used to cleave vicinal diols to form aldehydes.

References 

Ruthenium compounds
Quaternary ammonium compounds
Oxidizing agents
Deliquescent substances